The American Physical Society honors members with the designation Fellow for having made significant accomplishments to the field of physics.

The following list includes those fellows honored from 1972 through 1997.

1972

 Earnest D. Adams
 Peter D. Adams
 David Adler
 Robert S. Allgaier
 John C. Allred
 Charles H. Anderson
 Sam M. Austin
 Robert W. Balluffi
 Gene A. Baraff
 Elizabeth U. Baranger
 Benjamin Frank Bayman
 Barry L. Berman
 Charles K. Birdsall
 Marshall Blann
 Hale van Dorn Bradt
 William F. Brinkman
 R. Brian Cairns
 A. G. W. Cameron
 Moshe Carmeli
 Thomas D. Carr
 John W. Clarck
 Sidney R. Coleman
 Carl B. Collins
 Peter J. Csavinszky
 Orlie L. Cutris
 William B. Daniels
 Sydney G. Davidson
 Harold L. Davis
 Peter T. Demos
 Richard M. Diamon
 Bertram G. Dick
 John O. Dimmock
 Mildred S. Dresselhaus
 Andrew H. Eschenfelder
 Stavros Fallieros
 Michael Ference
 Joel H. Ferziger
 Alexander L. Fetter
 Peter Fisher
 Gerald T. Garvey
 Raffaele R. Gatto
 Marvin W. Gettner
 Peter G. Gibbs
 M. Alten Gilleo
 Roy Jay Glauber
 Joshua N. Goldberg
 William W. Graessley
 Kenneth R. Greider
 David S. Guralnik
 Edith C. Halbert
 Bertrand I. Halperin
 Donald R. Hamann
 Edward R. Harrison
 Michael J. Harrison
 Howard R. Hart
 Paul L. Hartman
 Leon Heller
 Charles H. Henry
 Rolfe H. Herber
 Pierre C. Hohenberg
 Donald F. Holcomb
 Nick Holonyak
 Henry O. Hooper
 John C. Hopkins
 Paul S. Hubbard
 John P. Hummel
 Arthur M. Jaffe
 Joachim W. Janecke
 Leo F. Johnson
 David L. Judd
 Wolfgang Kaiser
 Larry Kevan
 Edward A. Knapp
 Daniel S. Koltun
 Jan Korringa
 Herbert Kroemer
 John A. Kuehner
 Richard L. Lander
 Dietrich W. J. Langer
 Linwood L. Lee
 James E. Leiss
 David W. G. S. Leith
 Howard B. Levine
 Richard L. Liboff
 Allan J. Litchenberg
 John L. Lundberg
 Fritz Luty
 David W. Lynch
 Bruce H. Mahan
 Jagadishwar Mahanty
 Bernard Margolis
 Harvey Marshak
 James W. Mayer
 Kirk W. McVoy
 Denis B. McWhan
 Norman Menyuk
 Walter J. Merz
 Robert L. Mieher
 Douglas L. Mills
 Asoke N. Mitra
 Cornelius F. Moore
 Ezra T. Newman
 Sven G. Nilsson
 James R. Nix
 Kenneth L. Nordtvedt
 Leonard J. Nugent
 Morton B. Panish
 Earl R. Parker
 Peter D. Parker
 Roger B. Perkins
 E. Gale Pewitt
 Robert Otto Pohl
 Gerald L. Pollack
 Peter M. Rentzepis
 John D. Reppy
 Richard E. Robertson
 Donald Robson
 George L. Rogosa
 Ernest S. Rost
 Lawrence G. Rubin
 Arthur L. Ruoff
 Chih-Tang Sah
 Myriam P. Sarachik
 Leo Sartori
 Paul W. Schmidt
 Thomas A. Scott
 Donald Secrest
 Israel R. Senitzky
 Andrew M. Sessler
 Kamal K. Seth
 Carl M. Shakin
 Benjamin Shih-Ping Shen
 Yuen Ron Shen
 J. Ely Shrauner
 Rolf H. Siemssen
 Robert H. Silsbee
 Harold P. Smith
 Lawrence C. Snyder
 William G. Spitzer
 William A. Steyert
 Myron Strongin
 Wilard L. Talbert
 Igal Talmi
 Barry N. Taylor
 Donald O. Thompson
 Rudolf E. Thun
 Reuben Title
 Robert Vandenbosch
 Antole B. Volkov
 Hans A. Weidenmuller
 Robert E. Welsh
 Raymond Wolfe
 George B. Wright

1973

 Richard A. Arndt
 Inder Paul Batra
 Milton Birnbaum
 Frederick W. Byron
 Nathaniel P. Carleton
 Thomas A. Carlson
 David E. Cox
 Stuart J. P. Crampton
 Langdon T. Crane
 Paul H. Cutler
 Cécile DeWitt-Morette
 Robert A. Dory
 Peder J. Z. Estrup
 John S. Faulkner
 Ervin J. Fenyves
 Kenneth J. Foley
 Victor Franco
 John D. Gavenda
 Hyatt M. Gibbs
 Kurt Gottfried
 Tetsuo Hadeishi
 John L. Hall
 Theodor W. Hansch
 Kenneth J. Harker
 Wynford L. Harries
 Arvid Herzenberg
 David A. Hill
 Keith B. Jefferts
 Myron A. Jeppesen
 Milton N. Kabler
 Quentin C. Kessel
 Lee J. Kieffer
 Thomas A. Kitchens
 Paul W. Kruse
 Neal F. Lane
 Marshall Lapp
 William C. Lineberger
 William A. Love
 Charles A. McDowell
 Eion G. McRae
 Ralph M. Moon
 David A. Moroi
 Kazem Omidvar
 Istvan Ozsvath
 Donald J. Plazek
 G. Wilhelm Raith
 Howard R. Reiss
 Thomas M. Rice
 Arthur Rich
 Hugh G. Robinson
 Leon D. Roper
 Manuel Rotenberg
 Richard H. Sands
 Richard I. Schoen
 Ivan A. Sellin
 Stephen M. Shafroth
 John R. Sheridan
 Charles E. Siewert
 Marvin Silver
 Albert Silverman
 Richart E. Slusher
 Earl W. Smith
 Winthrop W. Smith
 Mary Beth Stearns
 Michael E. Sturge
 Edward W. Thomas
 John S. Thomsen
 Walter W. Wada
 Samuel A. Werner
 Charles B. Wharton
 William W. Williams
 Jens C. Zorn

1974

 Raymond G. Ammar
 Elemer E. Anderson
 Robert J. Birgeneau
 Frank A. Bovey
 Louis Brown
 William M. Bugg
 Praveen Chaudhari
 Loucas G. Christophorou
 Robert D. Cowan
 Russell W. Dreyfus
 Lawrence W. Fagg
 Alan J. Faller
 Frederick C. Fehsenfeld
 Richard W. Fink
 H. Terry Fortune
 Richard B. Frankel
 Eugene Goldberg
 David M. Golden
 Arthur C. Gossard
 David J. Gross
 Stephen E. Harris
 Duane H. Jaecks
 Mark J. Jakobson
 Allen I. Janis
 Kenneth A. Johnson
 Frank C. Jones
 Frank E. Karasz
 John S. King
 Henry Kressel
 Melvin Leon
 Peter Lindenfeld
 Irving J. Lowe
 Edgar Luscher
 Gerald D. Mahan
 Joseph B. McGrory
 Joseph B. Meservey
 Wiliam Mims
 John T. Park
 Jan A. Rajchman
 Allen B. Robbins
 Russell L. Robinson
 Brian B. Schwartz
 Yaacov Shapira
 George W. Smith
 H. Eugene Stanley
 Jerome D. Swalen
 William P. Trower
 Chang C. Tsuei
 William M. Visscher
 James T. Waber
 Russell P. Walstedt
 Larry Zamick
 Jaap H. deLeeuw

1975

 Frank J. Adrian
 Robert R. Alfano
 Kinsey A. Anderson
 Paul A. Bagus
 Jack Bass
 Curtis E. Bemis
 Edmond Louis Berger
 Arno Bohm
 Merwyn B. Brodsky
 Ronald A. Bryan
 Joseph I. Budnick
 Charles A. Burrus
 Vittorio Celli
 Richard K. Chang
 Sow-Hsin Chen
 Elihu L. Chupp
 Thomas L. Cline
 Roger W. Cohen
 Thomas C. Collins
 Alvin W. Czanderna
 Hugh E. DeWitt
 James A. Earl
 Eugene Eichler
 Donald E. Ellis
 Raymond C. Elton
 Harold P. Eubank
 Leonard J. Eyges
 Chang-Yun Fan
 Giovanni G. Fazio
 James E. Felten
 Carl E. Fitchel
 Paul A. Fluery
 Moises Garcia-Munoz
 Carl H. Gibson
 Hilton F. Glavish
 Walter B. Goad
 Vitalii I. Gol'danskii
 Walter I. Goldburg
 Paul Gorenstein
 Hiram Hart
 Akira Hasegawa
 Albert J. Hatch
 Harry H. Heckman
 Ronald J. W. Henry
 Herbert N. Hersh
 Maurice Holt
 Frederic Holtzberg
 Franklin Hutchinson
 James S. Hyde
 Lloyd G. Hyman
 Robert Jaklevic
 Charles S. Johnson
 Jack R. Jokippi
 Franco P. Jona
 Clifford K. Jones
 Richard I. Joseph
 Prabahan K. Kabir
 Ivan P. Kaminow
 Paul L. Kelley
 Anne Kernan
 Freddy A. Khoury
 Clyde W. Kimball
 Toshimoto Kushida
 Jacques J. L'Heureux
 David M. Larsen
 Marcel A. R. LeBlanc
 Kenneth Lee
 Gilda H. Loew
 Bogdan C. Maglich
 Humphrey J. Maris
 Tony Maxworthy
 Gilbert D. Mead
 Charles J. Meechan
 Andre P. H. Mercier
 Arthur G. Milnes
 Simon C. Moss
 Michael M. Nieto
 Lee C. Northcliffe
 James M. O'Reilly
 Arno Allan Penzias
 Norman L. Peterson
 Thomas G. Phillips
 Benjamin Post
 Cedric J. Powell
 Richard H. Pratt
 Erling Pytte
 Reuven Ramaty
 Roy E. Rand
 Joseph P. Remeika
 James J. Rhyne
 Remo Ruffini
 Rolf P. Scharenberg
 George Schmidt
 David N. Schramm
 Nathan Seeman
 George W. Series
 Irwin I. Shapiro
 David H. Sharp
 Howard W. Shields
 Juda L. Shohet
 Rein Silberberg
 Sam M. Silverman
 Ronald F. Stebbings
 Edward C. Stone
 Bergen R. Suydam
 Robert J. Swenson
 Chung L. Tang
 Jan Tauc
 Louis R. Testardi
 James E. Turner
 James A. Van Vechten
 Kuppuswamy Vedam
 Satya Dev Verma
 Rochus E. Vogt
 Sten von Friesen
 William C. Walker
 Watt W. Webb
 William R. Webber
 Johannes Weertman
 Lodewyk Woltjer
 Chia-Wei Woo
 Robert A. Young
 Robert W. Zurmuhle

1976

 Farid F. Abraham
 Andreas C. Albrecht
 Neil W. Ashcroft
 Ronald A. Aziz
 James N. Bardsley
 Olof Beckman
 Robert J. Bell
 Eugene M. Bernstein
 M. L. Bhaumik
 Robert D. Birkhoff
 J. Bernard Blake
 Leroy N. Blumberg
 Richard J. Borg
 Jay P. Boris
 Marc H. Brodsky
 Laurence James Cahill
 Ngee-Pong Chang
 Shau-Jin Chang
 Ernest Coleman
 Homer E. Conzett
 Terrill A. Cool
 Bruno Coppi
 Basil Curnutte
 Ernest R. Davidson
 Peter G. Debrunner
 Adrian M. Degraaf
 Mauro DiDomenico
 Carl B. Dover
 John D. Dow
 Richard M. Drisko
 Shakti P. Duggal
 Robert A. Ellis
 Victor J. Emery
 Robert N. Euwema
 James L. C. Ford
 Jack H. Freed
 Riccardo Giacconi
 Roy Gerald Gordon
 Robert J. Gould
 Bernhard Gross
 Einar Hinnov
 Rodney T. Hodgson
 Daniel J. Horen
 John N. Howard
 George S. Janes
 Lawrence W. Jones
 William D. Jones
 Terry Kammash
 Gordon L. Kane
 J. Lawrence Katz
 Edwin M. Kellogg
 Daniel Kivelson
 Alan C. Kolb
 Sonja Krause
 Alan D. Krisch
 Albert B. Kunz
 Peter D. Kunz
 Tzee-Ke Kuo
 David P. Landau
 Jerome B. Lando
 Louis J. Lanzerotti
 Victor W. Laurie
 Yong Yung Lee
 Yuan Tseh Lee
 John C. Light
 Liu Liu
 James D. Livingston
 John A. Lockwood
 Michael J. Longo
 Gerald Lucovsky
 William J. Macknight
 John L. Magee
 John Lee Margrave
 James E. Mark
 David F. Measday
 Robert L. Melcher
 Donald I. Meyer
 David A. Micha
 Alexandru Mihul
 Robert A. Moline
 Charles Bradley Moore
 Robert S. Moore
 Harry Elecks Moses
 Ralph W. Nicholls
 Robert Merle Nicklow
 Vivian O'Brien
 James S. O'Connell
 Grover D. O'Kelley
 Nils Yngve Ohrn
 Oliver E. Overseth
 Heinz Rudolph Pagels
 Sandip Pakvasa
 Howard B. Palmer
 Yoon S. Park
 Raj K. Pathria
 Francis W. Perkins
 Sarah E. Petrie
 Miklos Porkolab
 Arthur M. Poskanzer
 Dusan Ciril Prevorsek
 Byron P. Roe
 Paul H. Rutherford
 Myron B. Salamon
 George A. Samara
 Alois W. Schardt
 Frank Scherb
 Irwin Schneider
 Milos Seidl
 Donald W. Setser
 Frederick D. Seward
 Ramy A. Shanny
 Arden Sher
 David Arthur Shirley
 S. Shtrikman
 John Silcox
 Kundan Singwi
 Gabor A. Somorjai
 Brian M. Spicer
 Harvey J. Stapleton
 George Stell
 Sanford Samuel Sternstein
 Herbert L. Strauss
 Bradford Sturtevant
 Yoshio Tanaka
 Ignacio Tinoco
 T Laurence Trueman
 Donald O. Van Ostenburg
 John C. Vandervale
 Yatendra P. Varshni
 Hans Christian von Baeyer
 James C. Walker
 Harold Weinstock
 John A. White
 John M. Wilcox
 Wendell S. Williams
 Michael Wortis
 Fa Yueh Wu
 Richard Henry Zallen
 Richard A. Zdanis

1977

 Roshan L. Aggarwal
 Stanley E. Babb
 Robert Z. Bachrach
 Vernon D. Barger
 Ralph H. Bartram
 Bruce J. Berne
 Robert Betchov
 John E. Bjorkholm
 Lynn A. Boatner
 Jill C. Bonner
 Stephen G. Brush
 Robert L. Burman
 Moustafa T. Chahine
 Yok Chen
 John F. Clarke
 Robert N. Compton
 Ronald C. Davidson
 Jacques Denavit
 Jay R. Dorfman
 Dieter Drechsel
 David Emin
 Horacio A. Farach
 David K. Ferry
 William A. Fitzsimmons
 Edward R. Flynn
 Alan C. Gallagher
 Joel I. Gersten
 Alfred S. Goldhaber
 Martin Gouterman
 Malcolm Harvey
 Karl T. Hecht
 Lucien Henry
 Helen K. Holt
 David A. Jenkins (physicist)David A. Jenkins
 Charles J. Joachain
 Egbert Kankeleit
 James L. Kassner
 Yeong Ell Kim
 Richard H. Kropschot
 Jacob J. Leventhal
 Nunzio O. Lipari
 Frank J. Loeffler
 James R. Macdonald
 Peter Mark
 Robert L. McGrath
 Jasper D. Memory
 A. W. Kenneth Metzner
 
 Richard E. Mischke
 Richard L. Morse
 Forrest S. Mozer
 Frederick M. Mueller
 Sang Boo Nam
 Ali H. Nayfeh
 Michael J. Newman
 Roy H. Neynaber
 Norman E. Phillips
 Martin Pope
 Hernan C. Praddaude
 Peter M. Richards
 Leonard Rosenberg
 Fred D. Rosi
 Henry F. Schaefer
 Michael Schulz
 Marlon O. Scully
 David J. Sellmyer
 Jan V. Sengers
 Lu Jeu Sham
 Yogendra N. Srivastava
 Harry L. Swinney
 Peter Thieberger
 Sandor Trajmar
 Arnold Tubis
 Arunachala Viswanathan
 Jack H. Wernick
 James F. Williams
 Chun Wa Wong
 William M. Yen

1978

 Eric G. Adelberger
 Yakir Aharonov
 Joel Alan Appelbaum
 R Edward Barker
 Peter D. Barnes
 James Edward Bayfield
 Alan J. Bearden
 Walter Benenson
 Aron M. Bernstein
 William Bertozzi
 George F. Bertsch
 John M. Blakely
 David L. Book
 James Alan Borders
 Raymond F. Boyer
 James D. Callen
 Ching-Wu Chu
 Milton Walter Cole
 Stephen H. Davis
 Bipin Ratital Desai
 Thomas F. Deutsch
 Donald F. DuBois
 Joseph H. Eberly
 Lewis R. B. Elton
 John R. Erskine
 Thomas E. Feuchtwang
 Edward Norval Fortson
 Frank Y. Fradin
 Robert S. Freund
 Fred R. Gamble
 Jose Dolores Garcia
 Rathindra N. Ghoshtagore
 Marvin D. Girardeau
 George W. Greenlees
 Reginald C. Greenwood
 Fred Bassett Hagedorn
 Kurt Haller
 Charles B. Harris
 Alexander L. Harvey
 Richard G. Helmer
 William M. Hooke
 Earl K. Hyde
 Andrew D. Jackson
 Derek Jackson
 Richard Calvin Jarnagin
 Donald Rex Johnson
 Noah R Johnson
 K. Kang
 Posey W. Keaton
 Charles F. Kennel
 Daniel Kleppner
 William Leo Kruer
 Norton D. Lang
 Morton Mandel
 Richard Marrus
 Pran Nath
 John W Negele
 Gerald G. Ohlsen
 Gayle S. Painter
 Alexander Pines
 Jacobo Rapaport
 John R. Sabin
 E. Brooks Shera
 Frank S. Stephens
 Paul M. Tedrow
 John B. Wachtman
 George D. Whitfield
 Cheuk-Yin Wong
 Richard K. Yamamoto
 Gisbert Zuputlitz
 Jorrit de Boer

1979

 David P. Balamuth
 Hall L. Crannell
 Hendrik De Waard
 P. M. Endt
 M. R. Flannery
 Robert W. Hendricks
 F. Iachello
 Wilfrid Basil Mann
 S. T. Manson
 Gary Earl Mitchell
 Masanori Murakami
 Denis L. Rousseau
 Paul C. Simms
 Vlado Valkovic
 A. Van Der Woude
 G. Walker

1980

 John J. Aklonis
 Daniel Albritton
 Barry J. Allen
 William B. Ard
 Lloyd Armstrong
 Louis A. P. Balazs
 Malcolm R. Beasley
 Henry G. Berry
 J. Robert Beyster
 Thomas J. Birmingham
 Lesser Blum
 Stephen E. Bodner
 Kees Bol
 Richard H. Boyd
 Howard C. Bryant
 Cyrus D. Cantrell
 D. Duane Carmony
 Steve H. Carpenter
 Robert J. Celotta
 Yau-Wa Chan
 Wendell K. Chen
 Tsu-Kai Chu
 Charles L. Cocke
 Timothy Coffey
 Donald Coles
 John W. D. Connolly
 Stuart L. Cooper
 Alexander Dalgarno
 Kenneth T.R. Davies
 Daniel L. Decker
 Joseph L. Dehmer
 John M. Deutch
 Robert L. Dewar
 Dirck L. Dimock
 Robert L. Dimock
 Paul Dimotakis
 RIchard J. Drachman
 Errol P. Eernisse
 Kent G. Estabrook
 Robert W. Field
 David W. Forslund
 Thomas F. Gallagher
 George Gamota
 Brange Golding
 Richard L. Greene
 Charles C. Grimes
 Steven M. Grimes
 Hermann A. Grunder
 Donald U. Gubser
 Herman W. Hoerlin
 Hiroyuki Ikezi
 Muhammad M. Islam
 Theodore A. Jacobs
 Fred M. Johnson
 Robert A. Johnson
 Michio Kaku
 Christos A. Kapetanakos
 Predhiman K. Kaw
 Larkin Kerwin
 Yong-Ki Kim
 James L. Kinsey
 Edward S. Kirkpatrick
 Norman C. Koon
 Steven E. Koonin
 Max G. Lagally
 Robert B. Laibowitz
 Gerard H. Lander
 Allan B. Langdon
 Roman Laubert
 Edward Prentiss Lee
 Jack R. Leibowitz
 Aaron Lewis
 James Chen-Min Li
 Michael A. Lieberman
 Morton Litt
 Chuan-Sheng Liu
 Karl E. Lonngren
 Wallace M. Manheimer
 Alfred W. Maschke
 Frederick J. Mayer
 Joseph Meixner
 Luke Wei Mo
 Jack M. Mochel
 Rabindra N. Mohapatra
 Mark Morkovin
 David Mosher
 Karl A. Muller
 John F. Nagle
 David W. Norcross
 Sokrates T. Pantelides
 Konstantinos Papadopulos
 Dimitrios A. Papconstantopoulos
 Vithalbhai L. Patel
 Robert M. Pearlstein
 Robert Pecora
 Perry A. Penz
 Franz Plasil
 Robert T. Poe
 Gerald C. Pomraning
 Carl Hugo Poppe
 Mark A. Ratner
 William P. Reinhardt
 Barrett H. Ripin
 Anthony Robson
 Ryong-Joon Roe
 Anatol Roshko
 Jonathan L. Rosner
 Erhard W. Rothe
 Theodore Rowland
 David A. Russell
 Jacob Schaefer
 Hugo V. Schmidt
 John T. Schriempf
 David K. Scott
 Robert J. Silbey
 Earl F. Skelton
 Neville V. Smith
 Julien Clinton Sprott
 Anthony F. Starace
 Robert L. Sugar
 Robert J. Taylor
 Eric D. Thompson
 Samuel B. Trickey
 Raphael Tsu
 R.J. Von Gutfeld
 Nobuyoshi Wakabayashi
 William Warren
 Robert M. White
 Marvin H. Wilkening
 Arthur R. Williams
 James P. Wolfe
 Dave H. Youngblood
 James F. Ziegler

1981

 Sidney Cyril Abrahams
 Andreas Acrivos
 Girish Saran Agarwal
 Edward T. Arakawa
 Don Alton Baker
 Myron Bander
 Michel L. Barat
 Bruce M. Barker
 Ray H. Baughman
 Fred Edmond Bertrand
 Aaron N. Bloch
 John Brayton Bronzan
 Donald Maxwell Burland
 Friedrich H. Bussee
 Frank Paul Calaprice
 Richard F. Casten
 Liu Chen
 Tsu-Teh Chou
 Norman H. Christ
 Paul H. Citrin
 Douglas Cline
 John Gillette Curro
 Marian Danysz
 William Ross Datars
 Ralph De Vries
 Joseph E. Demuth
 Frank S. Dietrich
 Francis Joseph Disalvo
 Gerald Dolling
 Robert C. Dynes
 Peter Michael Eisenberger
 Roger James Elliott
 Arthur Joseph Epstein
 Michael David Fayer
 Peter Julian Feibelman
 Gian Pero Felcher
 Leonard C. Feldman
 Alexander Firestone
 Paul Howard Frampton
 John Williams Gadzuk
 Nicholas E. Geacintov
 Amal K. Ghosh
 Jonathan I. Gittleman
 George C. Goldenbaum
 Victor Lawrence Granatstein
 Thomas J. Greytak
 Robert Bruce Hallock
 J. E. Hammel
 David Andrew Hammer
 Joachim Jacques Hauser
 Richard Heinz
 Walter F. Henning
 Noah Herskhowitz
 Akir Hirose
 John T. Hogan
 Paul M. Horn
 Bernardo A. Huberman
 Walter R. Johnson
 Lorella M. Jones
 Brian Raymond Judd
 Marc Aaron Kastner
 Denis Keefe
 Robert E. Kelly
 George A. Keyworth
 Kenneth L. Kliewer
 Martin Lampe
 David Chapman Langreth
 David Morris Lee
 Yee-Chun Lee
 Elliott Charles Levinthal
 Harold Ralph Lewis
 Erwin Felix Lewy-Bertaut
 James David Litster
 Helmut K. V. Lotsch
 James V. Maher
 Kazumi Maki
 Willem Van Rensselaer Malkus
 Claire Allen Max
 Bruce Douglas McCombe
 Thomas Conley McGill
 George Hunter Miley
 Ralph Wayne Moir
 George John Morales
 Asokendu Mozumder
 Venkatesh Narayanamurti
 John Arthur Nation
 Thomas Sherman Noggle
 Steven Alan Orszag
 Douglas Dean Osheroff
 Edward Ott
 Ronald Richard Parker
 Gary David Patterson
 Peter Paul
 Wiliam Marchant Prest
 Manfred J. Raether
 Robert Colemane Richardson
 Nathan Russell Roberson
 James A. Rome
 Nicholas Rott
 John Scheffield
 John A. Schmidt
 Barry Martin Simon
 John Robert Smith
 Phillip Allen Sprangle
 Michael John Stephen
 Robert G. Stokstad
 Szymon Suckewer
 Howard S. Taylor
 Gordon Albert Thomas
 Keith Irvin Thomassen
 Arthur H. Thompson
 Jay Tittman
 Robert E. Tribble
 Chandra Mohan Varma
 George A. Victor
 Daniel Frank Walls
 Jon Carleton Weisheit
 Harold Weitzner
 Roscoe B. White
 Samuel J. Williamson
 Niels Karl Winsor
 Giuseppe Zerbi
 John Jacob de Swart

1982

 Thomas K. Alexander
 Gianni Ascarelli
 G. Franco Bassani
 Clayton W Bates
 David R. Bates
 Gerardo Beni
 Rameshwar W. Bhargava
 Stephen G. Bishop
 Peter D. Bond
 Russell A. Bonham
 Allen H. Boozer
 Jeremiah U. Brackbill
 Virginia R. Brown
 Ray A. Burnstein
 Nina Byers
 Stephen H. Carr
 David Chandler
 Chung Yun Chang
 David Bing Jue Chang
 Leroy L. Chang
 Ta-Pei Cheng
 John R. Clem
 Robert William Conn
 William S. Cooper
 Eric L. E. Courtens
 John M. Crissman
 Ronald Yvon Cusson
 Richard C. DiPrima
 Joseph W. Doane
 John J. Dorning
 Alexander J. Dragt
 Jean Durup
 David L. Ederer
 Kenneth W. Ehlers
 Fred Henry Eisen
 Frank F. Fang
 Judith R. Franz
 Karl F. Freed
 Richard R. Freeman
 Jeffrey P. Freidberg
 Nelson S. Gillis
 Charles M. Glashausser
 Robert G. Glasser
 George Gloecker
 William A. Goddard
 Martin V. Goldman
 Howard A. Gordon
 Robert A. Graham
 Brian C. Gregory
 Daniel R. Grischkowsky
 Warren D. Grobman
 Charles Chih-Chao Han
 Thomas Joseph Hanratty
 Logan E. Hargrove
 Robert W. Hellwarth
 Anne Hiltner
 Roald Hoffmann
 Edwin B. Hooper, Jr
 Jack E. Houston
 Robert C. Hughes
 E. Atlee Jackson
 Sitaram S. Jaswal
 Carson D. Jeffries
 Roy R. Johnson
 Jiri Jonas
 George R. Kalbfleisch
 Paul Jesse Kellogg
 Raymond G. Kepler
 Hee Joong Kim
 Yong Wook Kim
 Charles M. Knobler
 John B. Kogut
 George T. Kokotailo
 Victor Korenman
 Edward J. Kramer
 Magne Kristiansen
 Ryogo Kubo
 Peter P. Lambropoulos
 Marten T. Landahl
 Sidney Leibovich
 Stephen R. Leone
 Donald H. Levy
 Paul A. Libby
 Rulon K. Linford
 Frank J. Lovas
 William G. Love
 Sudarshan K. Loyolka
 Rudolf Ludeke
 Arthur B. McDonald
 B. Vincent McKoy
 John P. McTague
 Richard P. Messmer
 David E. Moncton
 D. E. Murnick
 Jagdish Narayan
 Robert M. Nerem
 Gertrude F. Neumark
 Edward E. O'Brien
 Takeshi Oka
 Sidney L. Ossakow
 Linda R. Painter
 William H. Parkinson
 James W. Poukey
 Linda S. Powers
 David E. Pritchard
 A. Ravi Prakash Rau
 Edward F. Redish
 Thomas L. Reinecke
 William C. Reynolds
 R. G. Hamesh Robertson
 William S. Saric
 Barry I. Schneider
 Frank J. Sciulli
 Robert L. Scott
 Johanna M. H. L. Sengers
 Robin Shakeshaft
 Robert J. Shalek
 Ram R. Sharma
 Sunil K. Sinha
 Raymond Harold Spear
 John A. Stamper
 Ari van Steenbergen
 George M. Stocks
 Wolfgang Stodiek
 William Calvin Stwalley
 Jules W. Sunier
 Lawrence Talbot
 Philip Craig Taylor
 Philip L. Taylor
 Jan P. Toennies
 Joseph C. Tracy
 Egidijus E. Uzgiris
 Ernest J. Valeo
 Derek Walton
 Tsuey Tang Wang
 David L. Weaver
 Thomas A. Weber
 William H. Weinberg
 John A. Whitehead
 Sheila V. Widnall
 Herman H. Wieder
 Philip E. Wigen
 John W. Wilkens
 Jerry M. Woodall
 Alfred D. B. Woods
 James J. Wynne
 Gerold Yonas
 Ahmed H. Zewail
 Edward F. Zganjar

1983

 Chester Alexander Jr.
 Hans C. Andersen
 John Bryant Bates
 Brian Shephard Berry
 Heinz Bilz
 Alan Reginald Bishop
 John Blackwell
 Kenneth Brecher
 Christopher Richard Brundle
 Maurice Campagna
 Anthony Joseph Campillo
 George Slade Cargill
 William Jeffries Childs
 Alfred Y. Cho
 Patricia Elizabeth Cladis
 Enrico Clementi
 David Coward
 David H. Crandall
 Lloyd Craig Davis
 Dan Dill
 Gordon William Frederick Drake
 Frank Joseph Feigl
 Kenneth Fox
 Theodore Alan Fulton
 Crispin William Gardiner
 Benjamin F. Gibson
 Jerry Paul Gollub
 Elias Greenbaum
 Edward E. Gross
 Howard Grotch
 Robert Cameron Haight
 Victor E. Henrich
 Jack Gilbert Hills
 Paul Siu-Chung Ho
 Stephen S. Holt
 Chao-Yuan Huang
 John Dimitrs Joannopoulos
 Mikkel Borlaug Johnson
 Alvin Sheldon Kanofsky
 Faqir Chand Khanna
 James C. King
 James John Krebs
 Stamatios M. Krimigis
 Donald Quincy Lamb
 I. Richard Lapidus
 Sydney Leach
 William Alexander Lester
 Marvin Leventhal
 Frank S. Levin
 Raphael D. Levine
 Richard Emery Lingenfelter
 Andrew J. Lovinger
 Thomas Benjamin Lucatorto
 Robert Marc Mazo
 Thomas James McIlrath
 Dale Joseph Meier
 Paul H. E. Meijer
 Terry Alan Miller
 William Hughes Miller
 Joel M. Moss
 William Don Myers
 Russell T. Pack
 Charles Stedman Parmenter
 Laurence Elmer Peterson
 John Milo Poate
 Melvin Pomerantz
 Chris Quigg
 Aneesur Rahman
 William Hill Reid
 Eberhard K. Riedel
 José Ellis Ripper Jr.
 Allan Rosencwaig
 John Anthony Schellman
 Edward William Schlag
 David Nathaniel Seidman
 Bruce W. Shore
 Robert H. Socolow
 Daniel David Strottman
 Carlos R. Stroud
 Robert H. Swendsen
 Norman Henry Tolk
 James S. Trefil
 Yasutada Uemura
 Steven E. Vigdor
 Richard Frederick Voss
 William W. Willmarth
 William Hinshaw Wing
 Israel J. Wygnanski
 Frank von Hippel
 Stephen von Molnar

1984

 Millard H. Alexander
 William Lumpkin Alford
 Margaret Alston-Garnjost
 Thomas William Appelquist
 Angela Barbaro-Galtieri
 William Bardeen
 Albert Allen Bartlett
 John Thomas Bendler
 William M. Benesch
 Robert Lewis Berger
 Klaus Hans Berkner
 Arie Bodek
 Vladimir E. Bondybey
 Jean Pierre Briand
 Leonard Jack Brillson
 William James Leslie Buyers
 Carl Edwin Carlson
 Benjamin A. Carreras
 Roy Lunsford Champion
 Ling-Lie Chau
 Noel A. Clark
 Thomas B. Cochran
 Ronald Herbert Cohen
 Samuel Alan Cohen
 Paul Dare Coleman
 Gilles Marc Corcos
 Peter Robert Couchman
 Bunny Kay Cowan Clark
 George William Crabtree
 Kenneth Morse Crowe
 Patricia Moore Dehmer
 Lynn Dale Doverspike
 Laura Eisenstein
 Shalom Eliezer
 Samuel C. Fain Jr.
 Helmut Carl Faissner
 Thomas Ferbel
 George William Flynn
 Miriam Ausman Forman
 David B. Fossan
 Stuart Jay Freedman
 Joel M. Friedman
 Mary K. Gaillard
 Thomas Korff Gaisser
 Claus Konrad Gelbke
 Thomas Frederick George
 William Royal Gibbs
 Joseph Natale Ginocchio
 Allen Marshall Goldman
 Marvin E. Goldstein
 Eoin Wedderburn Gray
 Jonathan E. Grindlay
 John Frederick Hamilton
 John Christopher Hardy
 Otto Fredrich Hausser
 Allen Max Hermann
 Rober Lyman Hickok Jr.
 Christoph Hohenemser
 George Mitchel Homsy
 Charles F. Hooper Jr.
 Louis Norberg Howard
 Ralph Charles Isler
 Martin Henry Israel
 Abram Robert Jacobson
 Philip Benjamin James
 Lynn Woodard Jelinski
 Torkil Hesselberg Jensen
 Yi-Han Kao
 Edward P. J. Kartheuser
 Michael W. Kirson
 John A. Krommes
 Leslie Gary Leal
 Juliet Lee-Franzini
 Ling-Fong Li
 Ingolf Lindau
 John Douglas Lindl
 Joseph T. C. Liu
 Frederick Lobkowicz
 Douglas Henderson Lowndes
 Vera G. Luth
 Farrel Wayne Lytle
 Victor Arviel Madsen
 June Lorraine Matthews
 James Andrew McCammon
 Edward Charles McIrvine
 Robert Harrison Mellen
 Manuel G. Menendez
 Gerald A. Miller
 Stanley L. Milora
 Mark Samuel Nelkin
 Jerry A. Nolan Jr.
 Michio Okabayashi
 Stephen Lars Olsen
 Jonathan F. Ormes
 John Edward Osher
 Stanford R. Ovshinsky
 Damodar Mangalore Pai
 Leonard E. Parker
 Carl Elliott Patton
 Richard S. Post
 Gary Arthur Prinz
 Helen R. Quinn
 Ramaswamy Srinivasa Raghavan
 Joseph Reader
 John F. Reading
 Jack Edward Rowe
 Andrei Sakharov
 Michael Schick
 Peter A. Schroeder
 Roy F. Schwitters
 Mohindar Singh Seehra
 Isaiah Shavitt
 David Sherrington
 Philip Siemens
 Richard Edward Siemon
 Paul Francis Slattery
 James L. Smith
 Stuart Allan Solin
 Gene D. Sprouse
 Mark William Strovink
 Lawrence Richard Sulak
 David Wood Swain
 Teruo Tamano
 John Bryan Taylor
 Robert Leighton Thomas
 Thomas Timusk
 Larry H. Toburen
 Kosta Tsipis
 Albin Tybulewicz
 Carmine Vittoria
 M. Carl Walske
 George Denis Wignall
 Edward Witten
 Curt Wittig
 Stuart Alan Wolf
 Ching-Sheng Wu
 Peter Rudolf Wyder
 Albert F. Yee
 Daniel Zwanziger

1985

 Amnon Aharony
 George Armand Alers
 Gideon Alexander
 Tsuneya Ando
 Jonathan Arons
 Thomas Baer
 Barry Clark Barish
 Robert Allan Bernheim
 Elliott Daniel Bloom
 J. David Bowman
 Martin Breidenbach
 George S. Brown
 Keith Howard Burrell
 Ian Butterworth
 Robert Howard Callender
 Lawrence S. Cardman
 Albert Welford Castleman Jr
 Paul Michael Chaikin
 David Arthur Church
 John Clarke
 Eugene D. Commins
 Brad Cox
 Michael Creutz
 Lorenzo Jan Curtis
 Arnold J. Dahm
 Marc Davis
 Jean-Paul Desclaux
 Thomas J. Devlin
 Sebastian Doniach
 Bobby David Dunlap
 Elizabeth B. Dussan V.
 Gary J. Feldman
 Glennys Reynolds Farrar
 Zachary Fisk
 James Callaway Garland
 Reinhard Ludwig Genzel
 Frederick J. Gilman
 Robert Gilmore
 Marshall Lloyd Ginter
 Geoffrey Mark Grinstein
 Franz L. Gross
 Alan Harvey Guth
 Allan Mark Hartstein
 Jan F. Herbst
 Henry Allen Hill
 Franz Joseph Himpsel
 Brian Edward Hingerty
 Ed Vernon Hungerford
 A.K.M. Fazle Hussain
 Yoseph Imry
 Roman W. Jackiw
 Verne L. Jacobs
 Stephen Jardin
 Joshua Jortner
 Boris Jules Kayser
 Henry W. Kendall
 Klaus W. Klaus
 Raoul Kopelman
 Vaclav O. Kostroun
 Anthony James Leggett
 Chii-Dong Lin
 Lawrence Litt
 Bernard Andre Lotz
 Tom C. Lubensky
 Roger Morton Macfarlane
 Alexis P. Malozemoff
 M. Brian Maple
 Richard McFadden Martin
 Robert Lee McCrory
 Christopher Fulton McKee
 Aram Zareh Mekjian
 Robert B. Meyer
 Erik Leonard Mollo-Christensen
 Luciano Giuseppe Moretto
 Christopher Lee Morris
 Richard A. Muller
 Paul Suart Peercy
 Thomas Penney
 Christopher J Pethick
 Ronald S. Pindak
 E. Ward Plummer
 Mordecai Rosen
 Leonard Michael Sander
 Andrew M. Sandorfi
 Stephen E. Schnatterly
 James Howard Scofield
 Arnold John Sierk
 Katepalli Raju Sreenivasan
 Horst Ludwig Stormer
 Robert Anthony Street
 John Clark Sutherland
 Charles E. Swenberg
 Joseph Hooton Taylor
 Edwin Lorimer Thomas
 T. Darrah Thomas
 Michael Fielding Thorpe
 Jerry B. Torrance
 Daniel C. Tsui
 Richard P. Van Duyne
 Victor Emanuel Viola
 William Douglas Watson
 Richard A. Webb
 Edward L. Wolf
 John A. Woollam
 Barukh Yaakobi
 Masaaki Yamada
 Peter Yound Yu

1986

 James R. Albritton
 Phillip B. Allen
 Silas James Allen
 Robert E. Anholt
 Thomas M. Antonsen
 Ali S. Argon
 Daniel Jonathon Auerbach
 Naftali Auerbach
 Mark Ya Azbel
 Bertram Batlogg
 Robert Steven Bauer
 Paul R. Berman
 Ravindra N. Bhatt
 Gary Carl Bjorklund
 Ronald E. Blackwelder
 Christopher Bottcher
 Douglas Andrew Bryman
 Amyand David Buckingham
 John David Buckmaster
 Federico Capasso
 Peter J. Catto
 Tai-Chang Chiang
 William Chinowsky
 Ying-Nan Chiu
 Steven Chu
 David Richard Clarke
 Claude Cohen-Tannoudji
 David Risdon Crosley
 Paul J. Dagdigian
 Jack Davis
 Patrick H. Diamond
 James F. Drake
 Frank Barry Dunning
 Robert A. Eisenstein
 Kenneth B. Eisenthal
 Charles P. Enz
 Ralph Feder
 Paul D. Feldman
 Roger William Finlay
 Daniel Sebastian Fisher
 
 William R. Frazer
 Daniel Z. Freedman
 Jacques Friedel
 Henry Jonathan Frisch
 Pierre-Gilles de Gennes
 Albert Ghiorso
 H. Brian Gilbody
 John M. Goodkind
 Sandra Charlene Greer
 Dennis Stanley Greywall
 Feza Gursey
 Charles Martin Guttman
 Yukap Hahn
 Frederick Duncan Michael Haldane
 Eugene E. Haller
 Gail G. Hanson
 Haim Harari
 Richard J. Hawryluk
 Wallace Dean Hayes
 Thorwald Herbert
 David George Hitlin
 Robin M. Hochstrasser
 Darleane Hoffman
 Shaw Ling Hsu
 Setsuno Ichimaru
 Shirley Ann Jackson
 Allan Stanley Jacobson
 Marilyn E. Jacox
 Robert Loren Jaffe
 Thomas R. Jarboe
 David Robert Kassoy
 Frederick K. Lamb
 Paul G. Langacker
 Yue-Ying Lau
 Robert B. Laughlin
 Donald George LeGrand
 Edward Kyung-Chai Lee
 Patrick A. Lee
 Marc David Levenson
 Steven G. Louie
 Olli Viktor Lounasmaa
 Margaret L. A. MacVicar
 William Joseph Marciano
 Dennis L. Matthews
 J. Douglas McDonald
 Michael Walford McNaughton
 Horia Metiu
 Alfred Henry Mueller
 John Stuart Muenter
 Dietrich Muller
 Robert E. Nahory
 David Robert Nygren
 Sekyu Michael Ohr
 Gordon Cecil Osbourn
 Leonid Ozernoy
 Kosal Chandra Pandey
 Jay M. Pasachoff
 Phillip Pechukas
 Ronald Arthur Phaneuf
 William Daniel Phillips
 Michael Ronald Philpott
 Bernard Goodwin Pope
 Michael Herbert Prior
 Robert A. Ristinen
 Gary Wayne Rubloff
 John Henry Schwarz
 Bruce Albert Scott
 Pabitra N. Sen
 John Wesley Shaner
 Stephen M. Shapiro
 Robert Herman Siemann
 Eric D. Siggia
 Charles Kent Sinclair
 Richard Errett Smalley
 Arthur Stewart Smith
 Kurt A. Snover
 Paul Heinrich Soding
 Herbert Max Steiner
 Jeffrey I. Steinfeld
 Paul Joseph Steinhardt
 Clifford M. Surko
 Donald G. Swanson
 Richard Edward Taylor
 Lester E. Thode
 David J. Thouless
 Donald Gene Truhlar
 Won-Tien Tsang
 Michael S. Turner
 William C. Turner
 Ronald E. Waltz
 John David Weeks
 Clark Woody White
 Ronald H. Willens
 David Jeffrey Wineland
 Bruce Winstein
 Kevin L. Wolf
 Ming Lun Yu
 Chris D. Zafiratos
 Ahmet Ziyaeddin
 Paul Zoller

1987

 Philip L. Altick
 Orlando Alvarez
 Nabil M. Amer
 Klaus Andres
 W. David Arnett
 Phaedon Avoutis
 Lawrence Badash
 Harvey Edward Bair
 Bruce Richard Barrett
 George J. Basbas
 Gerd Bergmann
 Anand Kumar Bhatia
 David John Bishop
 Manfred Bitter
 Michael Thomas Bowers
 Richard Nelson Boyd
 Robert S. Brodkey
 Boyd Alex Brown
 Norman Brown
 Robert J. Budnitz
 Paul David Burrow
 William Hill Butler
 David S. Cannell
 Mark J. Cardillo
 Moses H. W. Chan
 Sunney I. Chan
 Morell S. Chance
 James Robert Chelikowsky
 C.F. Chen
 Shih-I Chu
 Kwong T. Chung
 Bruce Ira Cohen
 John Franklin Cooke
 Gerald Cooperstein
 John S. Dahler
 G. Thomas Davis
 Brian Roy Dennis
 Nilendra Ganesh Deshpande
 Duane Alfred Dicus
 Gerald J. Dolan
 Louise Ann Dolan
 Estia Joseph Eichten
 David John Ernst
 Charles Sherwood Fadley
 Charles M. Falco
 James Martin Farrar
 Richard D. Field
 Nathaniel Joseph Fisch
 Fernando Flores
 William T. Ford
 James Lewis Friar
 Harold Leo Friedman
 William Michael Gelbart
 Donald Stewart Gemmell
 William Ronald Gentry
 George Hudson Gilmer
 Bernard Gittleman
 Henry Russell Glyde
 Robert James Goldston
 Jeffrey Goldstone
 Paul Dutton Grannis
 Tom J. Gray
 George Gruner
 Donald A. Gurnett
 Martin O. Harwit
 Allan Austin Hauer
 Wick C. Haxton
 Eric Johnson Heller
 Joseph Pierre Heremans
 Jack M. Hollander
 James Chen Hsiang
 Heinrich Erwin Hunziker
 Daniel Lewis Jassby
 Sudhanshu S. Jha
 Walter Eric Kauppuila
 Lawrence Lee Kazmerski
 Lionel Cooper Kimerling
 Janos Kirz
 Michael L. Knotek
 Allen Stephen Krieger
 Alvin L. Kwiram
 Kenneth Lee
 Ira W. Levin
 Robert Grayson Littlejohn
 Neville Clinton Luhmann
 Keith Bradford MacAdam
 Benoit B. Mandelbrot
 Earl S. Marmar
 Gene F. Mazenko
 James H. McGuire
 William Charles Mead
 Allen P. Mills
 Peter J. Mohr
 Melvin Month
 Michael A. Morrison
 Ulrich Mosel
 David Mukamel
 Shaul Mukamel
 Cherry Ann Murray
 Murugappan Muthukumar
 E. Thomas Nash
 Bernard M. K. Nefkens
 William Joel Nellis
 David R. Nelson
 Anthony V. Nero
 Dennis M. Newns
 Mikko Antero Paalanen
 Jamshed Ruttonshaw Patel
 Roberto Daniele Peccei
 Claudio Pellegrini
 Warner L. Peticolas
 James Eric Pilcher
 Aron Pinczuk
 T.V. Ramakrishnan
 Neville William Reay
 Larry George Redekopp
 John Robert Rees
 Isaac F. Silvera
 Brian Matthew Salzberg
 George Choppel Schatz
 Richard A. Scribner
 Ping Sheng
 Shobha Singh
 William John Skocpol
 Richard C. Slansky
 Ronald Dennis Stambaugh
 Talbert Sheldon Stein
 Rogers Hall Stolen
 Henry Raymond Strauss
 Neil Samuel Sullivan
 Eric Carl Svensson
 Timothy James McNeil Symons
 Anthony William Thomas
 Walter Rollier Thorson
 Thomas Tiedje
 Matthew Tirrell
 James T. Tough
 James W. Truran
 Wu-Ki Tung
 T. Venkatesan
 Rand Lewis Watson
 Donald Henry Weingarten
 Andrew W. Weiss
 Alan Edward Whitmarsh-Knight
 Eyvind Hugo Wichmann
 Helmut Wiedemann
 Edward Aston Williams
 Barbara Ann Wilson
 Michael Stewart Witherell
 Richard Patrick Wool
 Stanford E. Woosley

1988

 James Bernhard Anderson
 Jeffrey Alan Appel
 Hassan Aref
 Daniel Ashery
 Robert Hamilton Austin
 Helmut Willy Baer
 Aiyalam P. Balachandran
 Itzhak Bars
 Eugene William Beier
 Carl M. Bender
 A. Nihat Berker
 Frederick Kent Browand
 Hugh R. Brown
 Truman Roscoe Brown
 Geoffrey Ronald Burbidge
 Robert Nathan Cahn
 John Montgomery Cameron
 David C. Cartwright
 Robert Joseph Cava
 Vincent S. Chan
 Ronald Richard Chance
 Michael Stephen Chanowitz
 Peter J. Chantry
 Daniel Simon Chemla
 Alan Fred Clark
 William Ernest Cooke
 Lennox L. Cowie
 David Cutts
 Sumner P. Davis
 John W. DeWire
 John B. Delos
 William Wallace Destler
 Donelli Joseph DiMaria
 Richard Keith Ellis
 Robert Pollock Ely
 Eugene Engels
 William Martin Fairbank, Jr
 Barry L. Farmer
 Michael Dennis Feit
 John McMaster Finn
 Robert McLemore Fleming
 Albert Lewis Ford
 Paul Forman
 Curtis W. Frank
 Allan David Franklin
 Martin P. Fricke
 William K. George
 James Bernard Gerardo
 Robert Benny Gerber
 Franco Antonio Gianturco
 George Gidal
 Clayton Frederick Giese
 Murdock Gordon Douglas Gilchriese
 Richard Alan Gottscho
 Harvey Allen Gould
 David W. Hafemeister
 Peter Hanggi
 John Harte
 Michael George Hauser
 Andrew Hazi
 Willem Theodorus Hendricus van Oers
 Richard J. Higgins
 John P. Holdren
 Nahmin Horwitz
 Gerard Van Hoven
 Ian H. Hutchinson
 Kenneth A. Jackson
 David C. Johnston
 Hiroshi Kamimura
 Elton Neil Kaufmann
 Michael Anthony Kinch
 Thomas Bernard Walter Kirk
 Robert Paul Kirshner
 John Robert Kirtley
 Ruby Ebisuzaki Krishnamurti
 Kenneth Charles Kulander
 Mukul Kundu
 Bennett Charles Larson
 Daniel John Larson
 Donald R. Lehman
 Ira W. Levin
 Alan P. Lightman
 Teck-kah Lim
 Anthony Tung-hsu Lin
 Eugene C. Loh
 Derek Irving Lowenstein
 Kelvin G. Lynn
 Kenneth B. Lyons
 Giorgio Margaritondo
 Alan G. Marshall
 John Albert James Matthews
 Gregory B. McKenna
 Emilio Eugenio Mendez
 Frederick Henry Mies
 Arthur I. Miller
 David Andrew Barclay Miller
 Gabriel Lorimer Miller
 Kunioki Mima
 John Hays Moore
 Hadis Morkoc
 Albert J. Moscowitz
 Sidney R. Nagel
 Dimitri Nanopoulos
 William McCay Nevins
 Dwight R. Nicholson
 M. Peter Nightingale
 Stephen Philip Obenschain
 Nobuyoshi Ohyabu
 Roy Jerome Peterson
 Klaus Pinkau
 Ronald Prater
 Joel Robert Primack
 Stuart Allan Raby
 Don David Reeder
 Thomas Nicola Rescigno
 James J. Riley
 Robert Rosner
 Stephen L. Sass
 Dale W. Schaeffer
 Robert E. Schofield
 James Frederick Schooley
 John Lindblad Schrag
 Jagdeep Shah
 Charles Vernon Shank
 Larry Lee Smarr
 George F. Smoot
 Rangaswamy Srinivasan
 Weston M. Stacey
 Joachim Stohr
 James Douglas Strachan
 Toshi Tajima
 Malvin Carl Teich
 Virginia L. Trimble
 Francis S. Troyon
 John Pace VanDevender
 Paul Adrian Vandenbout
 David Ward
 Erick J. Weinberg
 John Weiner
 Per Goran Wendin
 Robert Williams
 Thomas A. Witten
 Donald James Wolford
 Peter Guy Wolynes
 Henry Vernon Wong
 Hyuk Yu

1989

 Walter Wade Adams
 James Ward Allen
 John Edward Allen
 Edward Raymond Andrew
 Aloysius John Arko
 Bruce Arnold Barnett
 Rodney Joseph Bartlett
 Donald B. Batchelor
 William Eric Baylis
 David J. Bergman
 James Charles Bergquist
 Joel Mark Bowman
 Philip Russell Brooks
 John C. Browne
 Phillip Howard Bucksbaum
 Wit Busza
 Claude Canizares
 John Marland Carpenter
 John Robert Cary
 David Giske Cassel
 George Castro
 James Djamshid Chandi
 Tu-nan Chang
 Ho Sou Chen
 Hsien Kei Cheng
 Chia-Ling Chien
 Ara Chutjian
 Thomas Boykin Clegg
 Sidney Alan Coon
 John William Cooper
 Ferdinand V. Coroniti
 Phillip C. Cosby
 Forrest Fleming Crim
 Robert Dale Cutkosky
 John Price Doering
 John Francis Donoghue
 Richard Paul Drake
 William Alan Edelstein
 Bengt Elden
 Alan D. English
 James L. Erskine
 Kenneth M. Evenson
 Jens Feder
 Frederick R. Fickett
 Douglas B. Fitchen
 Joseph Ford
 Geoffrey Charles Fox
 Louis A. Frank
 William A. Friedman
 Elizabeth Garber
 J. Murray Gibson
 Steven Mark Girvin
 Richard Jay Goldstein
 Dennis Edward Grady
 Chris H. Greene
 Gary Stephen Grest
 Hermann G. Grimmeiss
 John Francis Gunion
 Paul K. Hansma
 Bruce N. Harmon
 Arthur Brooks Harris
 Donald LeRoy Hartill
 Satio Hayakawa
 Hanspeter Helm
 Jonathan P. Heritage
 Caroline Littlejohn Herzenberg
 Erwin Nick Hiebert
 Christopher T. Hill
 Chih-Ming Ho
 Allan R. Hoffman
 Barry R. Holstein
 Paul L. Houston
 Stanley Humphries
 K. Keith Innes
 Erich P. Ippen
 Nathan Isgur
 Alexander MacRae Jamieson
 Ronald Ceci Johnson
 James D. Jorgensen
 Glenn Russell Joyce
 Charles Fielding Finch Karney
 Henry C. Kelly
 Mark B. Ketchen
 John J. Kim
 H. Jeff Kimble
 Kate Page Kirby
 Jorg Peter Kotthaus
 Uzi Landman
 Jerzy Marian Langer
 Howard Paul Layer
 Ka-Ngo Leung
 Edward C. Lim
 Peter B. Littlewood
 Michael M.T. Loy
 Allan Hugh MacDonald
 Richard Madey
 Wayne Lee Mattice
 Julian Decatur Maynard
 Eric Mazur
 Samuel L. McCall
 Kirk Thomas McDonald
 Larry D. McLerran
 C. Alden Mead
 Paul Meakin
 James L. Merz
 RIchard A. Meserve
 Richard A. Mewaldt
 Linn Frederick Mollenauer
 Ernest J. Moniz
 Rollin John Morrison
 Shoji Nagamiya
 Gerald A. Navratil
 Abraham Nitzan
 Nai-Phuan Ong
 Hans-Rudolf Ott
 Gerald L. Payne
 Benjamin Thomas Peng-nien Chu
 Vincent Zetterberg Peterson
 Pierre M. Petroff
 Warren Earl Pickett
 Daniel T. Pierce
 Stuart Pittel
 William Henry Press
 Daniel Ethan Prober
 Saul Rappaport
 Robert Landen Ray
 Alfred Romer 
 Rustom Roy
 Samuel A. Safran
 Carl Edward Sagan
 Richard J. Saykally
 Abraham Seiden
 Earl David Shaw
 Melvyn Jay Shochet
 Hans Christoph Siegmann
 Frans A. Spaepen
 Constantine Stassis
 Bill Sutherland
 John Allen Tanis
 David B. Tanner
 John A. Tataronis
 Charles Behan Thorn
 Frank S. Tomkins
 Alan Edward Tonelli
 Michael Georges Tuszewski
 Leon P. Van Speybroeck
 Jacques Vanier
 James P. Vary
 Alexander Vilenkin
 James M. Wallace
 Stephen J. Wallace
 John Edmond Walsh
 Werner Weber
 Eric Weitz
 Bjorn Havard Wiik
 John P. Wikswo
 Clifford Martin Will
 Ronald R. Winters
 Robert Eugene Wyatt
 Allan Peter Young
 Malgorzata Zielinska-Pfabe

1990

 Steven A. Adelman
 David Charles Ailion
 Lew Allen
 Stephen Arnold
 Chi Kwan Au
 David H. Auston
 Samuel David Bader
 Gerhard R. Barsch
 Gunther Bauer
 Howard C. Berg
 Sabyasachi Bhattacharya
 David Kalman Biegelsen
 John J. Bollinger
 James B. Boyce
 Bennet Bristol Brabson
 Gerritt ten Brinke
 Charles N. Brown
 Markus Buettiker
 Joel Nathan Butler
 Thomas Anderson Callcott
 David Kelly Campbell
 George K. Celler
 Ming Sheng Chu
 Jolie A. Cizewski
 Gregory John Clark
 Elisha Cohen
 Leon Cohen
 George J. Collins
 Michael Kevin Craddock
 Buckley Crist
 Andrew Elliot Depristo
 Jozef Theofiel Devreese
 Leonard Matthew Diana
 Thomas William Donnelly
 Charles Frederick Driscoll
 Pedro Miguel Echenique
 Martin B. Einhorn
 Paul A. Evenson
 Fereydoon Family
 Harold W. Fearing
 Charlotte Froese Fischer
 Henry Eugene Fisk
 John Lawrence Freeouf
 Vladimir Fuchs
 Tony A. Gabriel
 James Roland Gaines
 Alper Abdy Garren
 Francis M. Gasparini
 Walter Glockle
 Valery A. Godyak
 Sol Michael Gruner
 Robert L. Gunshor
 James Douglas Gunton
 Devendra Gupta
 Torgny Gustafsson
 Miklos Gyulassy
 Klaus Halbach
 Chihiro Hamaguchi
 Serge Haroche
 William Hayes
 Morhehai Heiblum
 Jorge Eduardo Hirsch
 John T. Ho
 Hartmut Oskar Hotop
 John S. Huang
 David L. Huestis
 Gerald J. Iafrate
 Wayne M. Itano
 David M. Jasnow
 Joseph Andrew Johnson
 Chandrashekhar Janardan Joshi
 Paul Sebastian Julienne
 Eric Kay
 Joseph D. Kilkenny
 Stanley B. Kowalski
 Kenneth Saul Krane
 Lucjan Krause
 Morris Krauss
 Mark J. Kushner
 Kenneth D. Lane
 David C. Larbalestier
 Edison Parktak Liang
 Stuart Martin Lindsay
 Laurence S. Littenberg
 Eleftherios Mitiadis Logothetis
 Stewart Christian Loken
 Stephen R. Lundeen
 Swadesh Mitter Mahajan
 Philip Stephen Marcus
 Michael D. Marx
 Gary Miles McClelland
 John William McConkey
 Lillian C. McDermott
 Robert Bruce McKibben
 James Donald Meiss
 Fred Wolfgang Meyer
 Roger Ervin Miller
 Nariman Burjor Mistry
 Marcos Moshinsky
 Michael Jon Mumma
 Katsunobu Nishihara
 Jaan Noolandi
 Arto Veikko Nurmikko
 Piermaria Jorge Oddone
 David William Oxtoby
 John Boyd Page
 Robert S. Panvini
 Fred Petrovich
 Luciano Pietronero
 David Wixon Pratt
 David Long Price
 Martin Quack
 Wayne W. Repko
 Leo L. Riedinger
 Gene I. Rochlin
 Hal Jervis Rosen
 Kenneth J. Rothschild
 Thomas P. Russell
 Douglas Howard Sampson
 Werner Sandhas
 Roberta P. Saxon
 Lee Stewart Schroeder
 Jonas Schultz
 Varley Fullerton Sears
 Wolf Seka
 Lawrence Wayne Shacklette
 Philippe L. Similon
 Gerald James Small
 David Anthony Smith
 Robert John Soulen
 Orest G. Symko
 Cha-Mei Tang
 David W. Tank
 Thomas Nicholas Theis
 Michael L. W. Thewalt
 Rudolf Paul Thun
 Frank K. Tittel
 Melville P. Ulmer
 Masahiro Wakatani
 James Kay Graham Watson
 Erich Weigold
 Sheldon Weinbaum
 John C. Wheeler
 Carl Edwin Wieman
 Roy F. Willis
 Dan Winske
 Robert Claude Woods
 Wen-Li Wu
 Eli Yablonovitch
 Donald E. Young
 Stephen Michael Younger
 Michael E. Zeller
 Peter D. Zimmerman
 Ernst K. Zinner

1991

 Frederick H. Abernathy
 Gerhard Abstreiter
 Ronald J. Adrian
 Irag Ruhi Afnan
 Matthew Arnold Allen
 Richard Louis Anderson
 Raymond G. Arnold
 Arnold B. Arons
 Frank T. Avignone
 John Edward Eroc Baglin
 Daniel Charles Barnes
 Frank S. Bates
 Ernst G. Bauer
 Frederick Daniel Becchetti
 James Robert Beene
 Paul Murray Bellan
 Thomas Harold Bergeman
 Jerry Bernholc
 Norbert M. Bikales
 Roy Billinge
 James N. Bradbury
 Robert Alan Buhrman
 Robert L. Byer
 John Harris Cantrell
 Sudip Chakravarty
 Paul Morris Champion
 Ganesar Chanmugam
 Mau Hsiung Chen
 Chio Z. Cheng
 Roy Clarke
 Benjamin S. Cooper
 Alexander DeVolpi
 Anthony John Demaria
 Jules P. G. Deutsch
 Ken A. Dill
 Jonathan M. Dorfan
 Gerald Francis Dugan
 Alexander R. Dzierba
 Philip Charles Efthimion
 William Frederick Egelhoff
 Robert Ehrlich
 Richard R. Ernst
 Lyndon Rees Evans
 James Elliot Faller
 Dieter Fick
 Ronald Forrest Fox
 Paolo Franzini
 Bernard Frois
 Sergio Piero Fubini
 Gerald Gabrielse
 William J. Gallagher
 John Herbert Gardner
 William Ray Garrett
 Azriel Z. Genack
 Nicholas Joseph Giordano
 Kenneth Ivan Golden
 Edward Robert Grant
 Enrico Gratton
 Celso Grebogi
 Daniel Green
 Yogendra Mohan Gupta
 Etienne M.P. Guyon
 Alice Just Harding
 Clifford Kingston Hargrove
 William Louis Hase
 Adil B. Hassam
 Jerome Biller Hastings
 Hermann Anton Haus
 John Bingley Hayter
 Albert Peet Hickman
 Albert Josef Hofmann
 Thomas Y. Hsiang
 Joseph Donald Huba
 Winifred M. Huo
 Peter D. Johnson
 Philip Martin Johnson
 Steven Michael Kahn
 Michael L. Klein
 Cornerlius Ephraim Klots
 Jeffrey T. Koberstein
 Samuel Krinsky
 John Grant Larson
 Jean-Noel Georges Leboeuf
 Tsung-Shung Harry Lee
 Barbara Goss Levi
 Kathryn Levin
 Judah Levine
 Raphael M. Littauer
 Gabrielle Gibbs Long
 Fred Everett Luborsky
 Luciano Maiani
 Chanchal Kumar Majumdar
 Bruce H. Margon
 Indrek Martinson
 Yoshika Masuda
 Kevin M. Mcguire
 Althel Lavelle Merts
 Hendrik Jan Monkhorst
 Patricia M. Mooney
 Philip L. Morton
 Nil Lilienberg Muench
 John Anthony Mydosh
 Samuel M. Myers
 Fred Myhrer
 Hassan M. Nagib
 Alan Marc Nathan
 Keith Adam Nelson
 David John Nesbitt
 Constantine A. Neugebauere
 Louis S. Osborne
 Michele Parrinello
 Dale Lee Partin
 James McEwan Paterson
 David John Pegg
 David Robert Penn
 Stephen John Pennycook
 Michael Pepper
 John Paul Perdew
 Sigrid Doris Peyerimhoff
 Fred Hugo Pollak
 Stephen B. Pope
 John P. Preskill
 Richard Henry Price
 Morris Pripstein
 Paul J. Reardon
 Roland Wells Redington
 Lynn Eduard Rehn
 Robert H. Romer
 F. Sherwood Rowland
 Bernard Sadoulet
 Dale Edward Sayers
 Dietrich Schroeer
 Giacinto Scoles
 David George Seiler
 Gerhard Martin Sessler
 Michael H. Shaevitz
 Jag Jeet Singh
 Lawrence Sirovich
 John Smith
 Elias Snitzer
 Constantinos M. Soukoulis
 John Charles Spence
 Allan Daniel Stauffer
 Gary Steigman
 Gregory Brian Stephenson
 David Gordon Stroud
 Roger H. Stuewer
 Samuel Isaac Stupp
 Chong Sook P. Sung
 Abraham Szoke
 Frank Tabakin
 Christopher K.W. Tam
 E. Dennis Theriot
 Shih-Tung Tsai
 Raymond Tsutse Tung
 James J. Valentini
 Robert S. Van Dyck
 Joseph T. Verdeyen
 Friedrich Wagner
 James David Allen Walker
 John H. Weaver
 Willes H. Weber
 Franz Joachim Wegner
 Henry Richard Weller
 Hemantha Kumar Wickramasinghe
 Tung-Mow Yan
 Sau Lan Yu Wu
 Ellen Gould Zweibel
 Earl Frederick Zwicker

1992

 Alexei A. Abrikosov
 Boris L. Altshuler
 Eric J. Amis
 David Vincent Anderson
 James Russell Asay
 David D. Awschalom
 Paul Frank Barbara
 Klaas Bergmann
 Elliot R. Bernstein
 Thomas Joseph Bowles
 George W. Brandenburg
 Yvan J. Bruynseraede
 Ernst Bucher
 Joachim Burgdorfer
 David Lyle Burke
 Adam Seth Burrows
 David Charles Cassidy
 David M. Ceperley
 Colston Chandler
 Meera Chandrasekhar
 Andrew Francis Cheng
 Wei-Kan Chu
 Charles Winthrop Clark
 Francis E. Close
 Francis T. Cole
 Susan N. Coppersmith
 Marjorie D. Corcoran
 Robert D. Cousins
 Carol Jo Crannell
 Jack Emerson Crow
 John Perry Cumalat
 Hai-Lung Dai
 Richard Stephen Davis
 Yaroslav S. Derbenev
 Thomas Harold Dunning
 Pulak Dutta
 James Gary Eden
 Donald Andrew Edwards
 Alexei L. Efros
 James P. Eisenstein
 George E. Ewing
 Roger Wirth Falcone
 David E. Farrell
 Leonard X. Finegold
 John Edward Fischer
 Gerhard E. Fisher
 Raymond J. Fonck
 Jerry Wayne Forbes
 Fritz Josef Friedlaender
 Charles Stewart Gillmor
 Alan Leonard Goodman
 Christopher Robert Gould
 Steve Granick
 James Edward Griffin
 Jacob NMI Grun
 Hans Herbert Gutbrod
 James Stewart Harris
 Jeffrey A. Harvey
 Tony F. Heinz
 Jackson R. Herring
 Judith Herzfeld
 Art Hobson
 Frances Anne Houle
 Ruth H. Howes
 John Peter Huchra
 David Greybull Hummer
 David A. Huse
 Klaus Bruno Jaeger
 Robert V. F. Janssens
 Kenneth David Jordan
 George Ernest Kalmus
 Joseph I. Kapusta
 Gary Lee Kellogg
 Robert David Kephart
 Peter M. Koch
 Roger Hilsen Koch
 Paul R. Kolodner
 Joel Koplik
 John M. Kosterlitz
 Tung-Sheng Kuan
 Joseph Anthony Kunc
 Richard C. Lamb
 Lang L. Lao
 Ronald Martin Laszewski
 James Edward Lawler
 W. W. Lee
 Gerard Peter Lepage
 Peter Michael Levy
 Paulett Creyke Liewer
 Sung-Piau Lin
 Katja Lindenberg
 Gregory A. Loew
 Richard A. London
 Michael S. Lubell
 Luigi A. Lugiato
 Alan Cooper Luntz
 Jeffrey Whidden Lynn
 Don Harvey Madison
 George Edward Masek
 Dan McCammon
 Clyde William McCurdy
 John Cameron Miller
 Terence Edward Mitchell
 William Esco Moerner
 Kenneth Charles Moffeit
 Parvitz Moin
 Peter Alexis Monkewitz
 Keiji Morokuma
 Philip J. Morrison
 Nimai Chang Mukhopadhyay
 Yasushi Nishida
 J. Michael Nitschke
 Masayuki Ono
 Paul Francis Ottinger
 Sherwood Parker
 Stuart S.P. Parkin
 Gerald Alvin Peterson
 William P. Pratt
 James Douglas Prentice
 Hans-Joachim Queisser
 Clifford Edward Rhoades
 Rogers Charles Ritter
 John M. Rowe
 Ronald Don Ruth
 Marie-Louise Saboungi
 Edward Thaddeus Samulski
 Wilton Turner Sanders
 Sankar Das Sarma
 Tatuya Sasakawa
 Alfred Simon Schlachter
 Zach Schlesinger
 Hans A. Schuessler
 Klaus Schulten
 Hugh Lawrence Scott
 Marjorie Dale Shapiro
 Stephen Roger Sharpe
 Benjamin Ching-Chun Shen
 James D. Simpson
 John Michael Soures
 Kenneth Charles Stanfield
 Edward A. Stern
 James Reginald Stevens
 Kumble R. Subbaswamy
 Richard Michael Talman
 Toyoichi Tanaka
 Richard Joel Temkin
 James R. Thompson
 Joe David Thompson
 George Charles Turrell
 James Walter Van Dam
 David Lloyd VanderHart
 Conrad M. Williams
 Ellen D. Williams
 Sigurd Wagner
 Thomas Patrick Wangler
 Wu-Tsung W. Weng
 Bruce Joseph West
 Matthew Norton Wise
 John Thomas Yates
 Glenn Reid Young
 Peter Zoller
 Antonio Carlos de Sa Fonseca

1993

 Carl W. Akerlof
 Massimo Altarelli
 Ole K. Andersen
 Oscar A. Anderson
 W. Lester S. Andrews
 Michael John Aziz
 Per Bak
 Anna Christina Balazs
 Alfonso Baldereschi
 James B. Ball
 R. Michael Barnett
 Gerald Bastard
 Kurt H. Becker
 Kevin Shawn Bedell
 Robert Paul Behringer
 Gary Lee Bennett
 Stephano Bernabei
 Frederick Michael Bernthal
 Amitava Bhattacharjee
 Jean Luc Bredas
 Ross D. Bringans
 Paul W. Brumer
 Bimla Buti
 Carolyn Denise Caldwell
 Eugene M. Chudnovsky
 Francisco Claro
 Donald L. Correll
 Donald Gerald Coyne
 Janusz Dabrowski
 Per Fridtjof Dahl
 Jay Clarence Davis
 Viktor Konstantyn Decyk
 George Dennis Dracoulis
 Adam T. Drobot
 Ora Entin-Wohlman
 Shahab Etemad
 Anthony Fainberg
 Julio Fernando Fernandez
 Arne Woolset Fliflet
 Didler de Fontaine
 Melissa E. B. Franklin
 Gerald G. Fuller
 Elsa M. Garmire
 Barbara Jane Garrison
 Katherine R. Gebbie
 Donald F. Geesaman
 Neil Gehrels
 Howard Georgi
 Giorgio M. Giacomelli
 Roy Gordon Goodrich
 Laura H. Greene
 Gunter Grieger
 James Edward Gubernatis
 Parvez Nariman Guzdar
 Howard Haber
 Georges Hadziioannou
 Lawrence John Hall
 Kristl B. Hathaway
 Arthur F. Hebard
 Richard Henry Helm
 John Charles Hemminger
 Peter Herczeg
 Dennis W. Hewett
 Edward A. Hinds
 Lillian Hartman Hoddeson
 David K. Hoffman
 Stephen Dockler Holmes
 Roy J. Holt
 Anthony Houghton
 Richard E. Howard
 Cheng-Cher Huang
 Huey-Wen Huang
 Bruce Samuel Hudson
 Patrick Huerre
 Russell A. Hulse
 Maurice Jacob
 Kenneth C. Janda
 John A. Jaros
 Javier S. Jimenez
 Rainer Johnsen
 Noble Marshall Johnson
 Daniel D. Joseph
 Malvin H. Kalos
 Daniel M. Kammen
 Raymond Edward Kapral
 Kimo Kaski
 Eberhard K. Keil
 John Gordon King
 Miguel German Kiwi
 Joseph Klafter
 Lia Krusin-Elbaum
 Julius Kuti
 Joseph T. Lach
 Ronald Gary Larson
 Silvanus S. Lau
 Christoph W. Leemann
 Frieder Lenz
 Anthony Leonard
 Marsha I. Lester
 Herbert Levine
 Robert R. Lewis
 Timothy P. Lodge
 Jose Luis Moran Lopez
 Serge Luryi
 Ernest IIya Malamud
 Andreas Mandelis
 Joseph V. Martinez
 Glenn Marggraf Mason
 Ernesto Mazzucato
 James S. McCarthy
 Joseph Charles McDonald
 Robert D. McKeown
 David John Millener
 Thomas M. Miller
 Michael Robert Moldover
 Eduardo Chaves Montenegro
 Johan Elisa Mooij
 Sadao Nakai
 Thomas L. Neff
 Robert John Nemanich
 Daniel Milton Neumark
 Catherine Barbara Newman-Holmes
 Cheuk-Yiu Ng
 Jens N. Oddershede
 Harold Olof Ogren
 Eric Oldfield
 Clifford Gerald Olson
 Elaine Surick Oran
 Joseph W. Orenstein
 Victor Manuel Orera
 Yuri F. Orlov
 Julio Mario Ottino
 Hasan Padamsee
 Jen-Chieh Peng
 Clive H. Perry
 Bernard M. Pettitt
 Julia M. Phillips
 Nanette Phinney
 Helmut Piel
 Edward H. Poindexter
 Andrea Prosperetti
 Ricardo Leiva Ramirez
 Emmanuel Iosif Rashba
 Allan Reiman
 Geraldine L. Richmond
 Donald O. Rockwell
 Phillip Grisier Roos
 Ralph Z. Roskies
 Marc Christopher Ross
 Marvin Ross
 Abdus Salam
 Lynn Frances Schneemeyer
 Brian David Serot
 Michael F. Shlesinger
 James Siegrist
 Pierre Sikivie
 William Thomas Silfvast
 Stanley Skupsky
 Ivo Slaus
 Cullie James Sparks
 Steven William Stahler
 Rainer Ludwig Stenzel
 Gregory Randall Stewart
 Alfred Douglass Stone
 Sheldon Leslie Stone
 Ronald M. Sundelin
 Ulrich Werner Suter
 Jean Hebb Swank
 Isao Tanihata
 Paul Willis Terry
 Rudolf M. Tromp
 William Ernest Turchinetz
 J. Anthony Tyson
 Robert F. C. Vessot
 Johann Albrecht Wagner
 Chin Hsien Wang
 Trevor C. Weekes
 Claude Weisbuch
 Martin C. Weisskopf
 Michael B. Weissman
 David A. Weitz
 William Weltner Jr.
 Pierre Wiltzius
 King-Lap Wong
 Miguel Jose Yacaman
 David Owen Yevick
 Simon Shin-Lun Yu
 Arnulfo Zepeda
 Stewart Jay Zweben
 Alberto Franco de Santoro

1994

 Neal Broadus Abraham
 John F. Ahearne
 Harjit Singh Ahluwalia
 John M. Alexander
 Jeeva Satchith Anandan
 Peter B. Armentrout
 Ahmet Yasar Aydemir
 A. Baha Balantekin
 Jayanth R. Banavar
 Harrison Hooker Barrett
 Ilan Ben-Zvi
 Paul Allan Bernhardt
 R. Russell Betts
 Joseph John Bisognano
 Louis Aub Bloomfield
 John Francis Brady
 Peter Braun-Munzinger
 Harold Brown
 Reinhard Frank Bruch
 Charles Edwin Campbell
 John Howard Carmichael
 Sylvia Teresse Ceyer
 Chung-Hsuan Winston Chen
 Stephen Z.D. Cheng
 Shirley Chiang
 Gianfranco Chiarotti
 Alan A. Chodos
 Niels Tage Egede Christensen
 Philip Ira Cohen
 Richard K. Cooper
 Michael Alan Copland
 Derrick Samuel F. Crothers
 Donald Robert Curran
 Roger F. Dashen
 Michael Dine
 Athene Margaret Donald
 Daniel Herschel Eli Dubin
 Robert Everett Ecke
 Eleftherios N. Economou
 Gary Lynn Eesley
 Gerald Lewis Epstein
 Karl A. Erb
 Steven Alan Fetter
 Heinrich Edwin Fiedler
 Manfred K. Fink
 Michael Fowler
 Lazar Friedland
 George M. Fuller
 Peter Henry Garbincius
 Kenn Corwin Hancock Gardner
 Sylvester James Gates
 Timothy James Gay
 James Henry Glownia
 David Goldstein
 Erich Gornik
 Steven A. Gottlieb
 Paul Lee Gourley
 Richard Joseph Groebner
 Rajan Gupta
 Steven W. Haan
 Francis Louis Halzen
 Mishin Nayef Harakeh
 Jeffrey Hunter Harris
 Michael Arthur Harrison
 William George Harter
 Karl Hess
 Jeffrey Warren Hudgens
 Hugh Steven Hudson
 Sek Wen Hui
 Boris Lazarevich Ioffe
 Harold E. Jackson
 Ralph Raymond Jacobs
 Erik Jakobsson
 Joseph Martin Jasinski
 Yanching Jerry Jean
 Barbara Jones
 Ravinder Kachru
 Catherine Kallin
 Aharon Kapitulnik
 Kwang-Je Kim
 Mahn Won Kim
 Hubert Ellis King
 George Kirczenow
 Theodore Ross Kirkpatrick
 Richard Andrew Klemm
 Che-Ming Ko
 Matti Krusius
 Kuniharu Kubodera
 Robert L. Kuczkowski
 Narendra Kumar
 Robert Henry Lehmberg
 Michael Jerry Levine
 Keng S. Liang
 Donald H. Liebenberg
 Ingvar Per Kare Lindgren
 Christopher H. Llewellyn-Smith
 Christopher John Lobb
 Toh-Ming Lu
 Thomas S. Lundgren
 David Brian MacFarlane
 Douglas E. MacLaughlin
 Subhendra Dev Mahanti
 Hokwang Mao
 Grant James Mathews
 Roger Heering Miller
 Donald A. Monticello
 Thomas Joseph Morgan
 Ana Celia Mota
 Theodore D. Moustakas
 Berndt Mueller
 Eric Phillip Muntz
 N. Sanjeeva Murthy
 Witold Nazarewicz
 Allan A. Needell
 G. Paul Neitzel
 Peter Van Nieuwenhuizen
 Richard E. Packard
 Costas N. Papanicolas
 Robert Kelly Parker
 John F. Paulson
 Hans Laszlo Pecseli
 Nasser Peyghambarian
 Loren N. Pfeiffer
 Eliyahou Pollak
 Joseph S. Poon
 Akunuri V. Ramayya
 Sally K. Ride
 Emanuele Rimini
 Dan-Olof W. Riska
 Bradley Lee Roberts
 Robert Edward Robson
 Thomas Felix Rosenbaum
 Peter Jacob Rossky
 John Joseph Rush
 John J. Russell
 Cyrus R. Safinya
 William Lee Schaich
 Dalton D. Schnack
 Susan Joyce Seestrom
 Vitali Donovich Shapiro
 Marleigh Chandler Sheaff
 Richard L. Sheffield
 Paul Fenton Shepard
 Robert E. Shrock
 Arthur Lee Smirl
 Robert Gene Snyder
 Santosh Kumar Srivastava
 Michael John Stavola
 Duncan Gregory Steel
 George Franklin Sterman
 Ryszard Stroynowski
 Sune R. Svanberg
 Jack Bernard Swift
 Ronald E. Taam
 Tony Stephen Taylor
 Jerry D. Tersoff
 Claudia Denke Tesche
 Saul A. Teukolsky
 Henry Sze-Hoi Tye
 Michel Andre Van Hove
 Silvia L. Volker
 Robert Joseph Warmack
 Warren Sloan Warren
 Edwin Ross Williams
 Dieter Wolf
 Michael Charles Zarnstorff
 George Moiseevitch Zaslavsky
 Abdelfattah M. G. Zebib
 Johannes M. J. van Leeuwen
 Ernst D. von Meerwall

1995

 Steven Lynn Allen
 Miron Ya Amusia
 Ennio Arimondo
 Cyrus Baktash
 James Stutsman Ball
 William A. Barletta
 Guenter G. Baum
 Max L. Berkowitz
 Guy C. Berry
 Ved Prakash Bhatnagar
 Philip A. Blythe
 Punit Boolchand
 Kit Hansell Bowen
 Larry Lee Boyer
 Helmut Rainer Brand
 Robert M. Briber
 Ian Gordon Brown
 Ludwig W. Bruch
 Robert Allen Bubeck
 Carlos J. Bustamante
 Swapan Chattopadhyay
 Pisin Chen
 Shiyi Chen
 Timothy Edward Chupp
 Christopher E. Clayton
 James Samuel Cohen
 Lee A. Collins
 Barbara Hope Cooper
 Martin D. Cooper
 Pierce S. Corden
 Thomas M. Cormier
 Patricia Metzger Cotts
 Robert Woodhouse Crompton
 Michael C. Cross
 George Csanak
 James Whitman Davenport
 Cary N. Davids
 Sally Dawson
 Harry William Deckman
 Lance Jenkins Dixon
 John Jacob Domingo
 Nancy M. Dowdy
 Reiner Martin Dreizler
 Howard Dennis Drew
 Vernon J. Ehlers
 Donald M. Eigler
 Theodore Lee Einstein
 Jack W. Ekin
 Luis R. Elias
 Steven Michael Errede
 Ilya I. Fabrikant
 Joel Fajans
 Lewis John Fetters
 Gerald J. Fishman
 Ching-Yao Fong
 Margaret J. Geller
 Nigel David Goldenfeld
 Harvey Allen Gould
 Peter Fitzroy Green
 Geoffrey L. Greene
 Donald Christian Griffin
 Marcos Hugo Grimsditch
 David Lawrence Griscom
 Robert Cort Haddon
 Taik Soo Hahm
 Richard Alan Haight
 Malcolm Golby Haines
 Pertti J. Hakonen
 Dennis Gene Hall
 William P. Halperin
 Rodney Elbert Harrington
 Blayne Heckel
 Bretislav Victor Heinrich
 Kenneth Jeffrey Heller
 Russell Julian Hemley
 David Orlin Hestenes
 James Conway Higdon
 Kai Ming Ho
 Wilson Ho
 Evelyn Lynn Hu
 Randall G. Hulet
 Rudolph C. Hwa
 George Francis Imbusch
 Warren Bruce Jackson
 William Morgan Jackson
 Anthony M. Johnson
 Peter I. P. Kalmus
 Yoshiaki Kato
 Bradley D. Keister
 Kirby Wayne Kemper
 Thomas Albert Kennedy
 Stephen D. Kevan
 Barry M. Klein
 Dale D. Koelling
 Henry Krakauer
 Syamal Kumar Lahiri
 Jeffrey S. Lannin
 Kevin K. Lehmann
 Mel Philip Levy
 Charles M. Lieber
 Larry S. Liebovitch
 Peter Sejersen Lomdahl
 Gabriel Luther
 Brian James MacGowan
 Paul Blanchard Mackenzie
 Janardhan Manickam
 William Anthony Mann
 Nagi Nicholas Mansour
 Gerald E. Marsh
 Jay N. Marx
 Moshe Matalon
 Richard Alfred Matzner
 Michael E. Mauel
 Michael M. May
 Donald G. McDonald
 Natalia Kalfe Meshkov
 Howard Michael Milchberg
 James Paul Miller
 William R. Molzon
 Philip John Morris
 Samuel Harvey Moseley
 Thomas W. Mossberg
 Tsuneyoshi Nakayama
 Risto Matti Nieminen
 Tetsuji Nishikawa
 Michael Ray Norman
 Shoroku Ohnuma
 Jose Nelson Onuchic
 Robert Steell Orr
 Carmen Ortiz
 Eric H. Pinnington
 Robert Louis Powell
 Paras N. Prasad
 Stephen Turnham Pratt
 Paul Anthony Quin
 Terence John Quinn
 George W. Rayfield
 Bruce A. Remington
 Peter James Reynolds
 Charles Wayne Roberson
 Ian Keith Robinson
 Joseph Rotblat
 Richard Eiseman Rothschild
 Probir Roy
 Serge Rudaz
 Bernard Sapoval
 Ned Robert Sauthoff
 Harvey Scher
 Jan Frederick Schetzina
 Mordechay Schlesinger
 Dieter Herbert Schneider
 Wolf-Udo Schrvder
 John Theodore Seeman
 Ker-Chung Shaing
 Robert N. Shelton
 Kenneth Wayne Shepard
 Michael S. Shur
 Joseph I. Silk
 Joel A. Snow
 Jin-Joo Song
 Roger L. Stockbauer
 Paul Stoler
 Edward J. Strait
 Haskell Joseph Taub
 Julia A. Thompson
 Jeffrey Y. Tsao
 Dale J. Van Harlingen
 David Vanderbilt
 Zeev Valentine Vardeny
 Thomas A. Weaver
 Stephen A. Wender
 John Bailey West
 Alice Elizabeth White
 Douwe Alle Wiersma
 Richard Guy Woolley
 York-Peng Edward Yao
 Michael C. Zerner
 Francisco de la Cruz

1996

 A. Paul Alivisatos
 Ralph F. Baierlein
 Yehuda Benzion Band
 Roger Odell Bangerter
 James M. Bardeen
 Lynn M. Barker
 Philip Edward Batson
 Uwe Eugen Becker
 Dick Bedeaux
 Ami Emanuel Berkowitz
 A. John Berlinsky
 Edmund Bertschinger
 William Samuel Bialek
 Jozef Bicerano
 Geoffrey Bodenhausen
 John Edward Bowers
 John Stuart Briggs
 Keith Burnett
 Blas Cabrera
 Marvin Eugene Cage
 Brian J. Cantwell
 George James Caporaso
 William C. Carithers
 Nicholas J. Carrera
 Yves Jean Chabal
 Ivan Emilio Chambouleyron
 Che Ting Chan
 Cheng-Hsuan Sunshine Chen
 Chien-Te Chen
 Kwok-Tsang Cheng
 Carmen Cisneros
 Harvey Cline
 E. William Colglazier
 Max Cornacchia
 William O. Criminale
 Leonard S. Cutler
 Earl Dan Dahlberg
 Supriyo Datta
 Paul Davidovits
 Arthur F. Davidsen
 Claude Deutsch
 Louis Franklin DiMauro
 Dana D. Dlott
 Jack Frank Douglas
 Robert Dean DuBois
 Michael J. Duff
 Paul A. Durbin
 Maria Dworzecka
 Igor E. Dzyaloshinskii
 Helmut Eckelmann
 Kevin Einsweiler
 Paul Erdös
 Eric Hans Esarey
 Lee A. Feldkamp
 Da Hsuan Feng
 Massimo Vincenzo Fischetti
 Alex Friedman
 John Nicolas Galayda
 Jean Weil Gallagher
 Rodolfo Gambini
 Peter Ledel Gammel
 Walter Gekelman
 Kenneth W. Gentle
 Laurence Doon Gibbs
 Ronald Matthew Gilgenbach
 Orest Jaroslaw Glembocki
 Robert J. Gordon
 William George Graham
 Bob D. Guenther
 Nicholas John Hadley
 Vasken Hagopian
 Bruce A. Hammel
 John William Harris
 Shlomo Havlin
 Pawel Hawrylak
 William Walter Heidbrink
 Donald E. Heiman
 Christopher Lee Henley
 Arnold J. Hoff
 Charles H. Holbrow
 Emil J. Hopfinger
 Zafar Iqbal
 John Irwin
 Barbara V. Jacak
 Hans Burkal Jensen
 James Norman Johnson
 Darrell Lynn Judge
 Jeffrey Alan Kash
 Thomas Christos Katsouleas
 Jack Dean Kingsley
 Wayne Harvey Knox
 Bruce E. Koel
 John L. Kohl
 James J. Kolata
 Vladimir E. Korepin
 Ahmet Refik Kortan
 Dennis G. Kovar
 Eckhard Krotscheck
 Jaan Laane
 Steve Keith Lamoreaux
 I Yang Lee
 Paul David Lett
 Barry Franklin Levine
 Walter H. G. Lewin
 Michael A. Liberman
 Christof Litwin
 William Gregory Lynch
 Ernest Ma
 Usha Mallik
 Daniel Robert Marlow
 Yitzhak Maron
 Gérard Claude Martinez
 John C. Mather
 Robert D. Maurer
 Fenton Read McFeely
 Michael Raymond Melloch
 Adrian Lewis Melott
 Karl L. Merkle
 Roberto Daniel Merlin
 Arthur F. Messiter
 Peter I. Meszaros
 Hans-Otto Meyer
 Pierre Meystre
 James Anthony Misewich
 Frank Edward Moss
 Michael J. Murtagh
 Harry E. Mynick
 Richard Sandor Newrock
 Malcom F. Nicol
 John E. Northrup
 Martin G. Olsson
 Joseph Francis Owens
 Stephen John Parke
 Thomas Perine Pearsall
 Y-K Martin Peng
 E. Sterl Phinney
 Steven Charles Pieper
 Frederick E. Pinkerton
 Anil Kumar Pradhan
 Calvin F. Quate
 Anatoly V. Radyushkin
 Miriam H. Rafailovich
 Nicholas Read
 Marion B. Reine
 Hanna Reisler
 Gregory Rewoldt
 Jeffrey D. Richman
 Charles Steven Rosenblatt
 Thomas Roser
 Lewis Josiah Rothberg
 Miquel Batalle Salmeron
 Jonathan Robert Sapirstein
 Robert Max Schmidt
 Horst Werner Schmidt-Boecking
 Kenneth Steven Schweizer
 Robert F. Sekerka
 Gerald H. Share
 Edward V. Shuryak
 Wesley Harold Smith
 Johanna Barbara Stachel
 Paul H. Steen
 James H. Stith
 Arthur Marshall Stoneham
 Laurance J. Suter
 Peter Charles Tandy
 John Joseph Taylor
 Ctirad Uher
 John Unguris
 Sukekatsu Ushioda
 Marthe Bacal Verney
 Oscar Edgardo Vilches
 Petr Vogel
 Robert M. Wald
 Gwo-Ching Wang
 Bernard Allen Weinstein
 Rainer Weiss
 Michael Widom
 Hartmut Zabel
 George B. Zimmerman

1997

 Teijo E.W. Aberg
 Gabriel Aeppli
 Abhay Vasant Ashtekar
 Jonathan Anders Bagger
 Joseph John Barrett
 Dietrich Wolfgang Bechert
 Kenneth Lloyd Bell
 Michael George Bell
 Joze Bevk
 Gregory Scott Boebinger
 Maria-Ester Brandan
 Joseph Michael Brennan
 Jeremy Quinton Broughton
 Robijn Fredrik Bruinsma
 Jose Manuel Calleja-Pardo
 Myron Keith Campbell
 Gordon D. Cates
 David W. Chandler
 Hsueh Chia Chang
 Robert Beck Clark
 Michael M. Coleman
 Patrick L. Colestock
 Eric Allin Cornell
 Persis S. Drell
 Robert Walter Dunford
 Ronald Francis Dziuba
 Mark D. Ediger
 Peter Clay Eklund
 Donald Charles Ellison
 Wolfgang Erhard Ernst
 Stefan K. Estreicher
 Edward E. Eyler
 Randall M. Feenstra
 Frank A. Ferrone
 Erhard Wolfgang Fischer
 Raymond Kurt Fisher
 Stanley Martin Flatté
 Curt A. Flory
 G. Richard Fowles
 Henry Philip Freund
 Joshua Adam Frieman
 Edward S. Fry
 Michael George Fuda
 Robert G. Fuller
 Moshe Gai
 Gurudas Ganguli
 Angel E. Garcia
 Michael Gaster
 Steven M. George
 Leonid I. Glazman
 Reinaldo Jaime Gleiser
 Jordan A. Goodman
 Lev Petrovich Gor'kov
 Phillip L. Gould
 Paul Michael Grant
 Benjamin Grinstein
 William Oliver Hamilton
 Gregory W. Hammett
 James Patrick Hannon
 Paul Henri Heenen
 Frances Hellman
 Irving Philip Herman
 Harold Frederick Hess
 Yew Kam Eugene Ho
 William F. Hoffmann
 Yasuyuki Horie
 Larry Russel Hunter
 Mohammed Yousuff Hussaini
 Randall Duane Isaac
 Lawrence David Jackel
 Jainendra Kumar Jain
 David Collingwood Jiles
 Jorge V. José
 Elliot Paul Kanter
 Wolfgang Ketterle
 David William Kisker
 Steven Allan Kivelson
 Charles E. Kolb
 Thomas Francis Kuech
 James Daniel Kurfess
 Anne L'Huillier
 Branka Maria Ladanyi
 Ad Lagendijk
 Edward Alan Lazarus
 Dunghai Lee
 Richard W. Lee
 Shyh-Yuan Lee
 Yehoshua Levinson
 John W. Lightbody
 Konstantin Konstantin Likharev
 Keh-Fei Frank Liu
 David John Lockwood
 Kam Biu Luk
 Joseph W. Lyding
 Ronald John Madaras
 Charles Felix Maguire
 Charles Francis Majkrzak
 Martin Paul Maley
 Mary L. Mandich
 John Piper Marriner
 Eugene Richard Marshalek
 John M. Martinis
 Gyvrgy Miklos Marx
 M. Keith Matzen
 Robert L. McCarthy
 Robert R. Meier
 Frank S. Merritt
 Warren B. Mori
 Tak Hung Ning
 John R. O'Fallon
 Richard M. Osgood
 Abbas Ourmazd
 Michael Arthur Paesler
 Wonchull Park
 Albert Clarence Parr
 Ann-Marie Martensson Pendrill
 Nikolaos A. Peppas
 Athos Petrou
 David J. Pine
 Joseph G. Polchinski
 Edward Pollack
 Charles Young Prescott
 Seth Putterman
 Roger Pynn
 Veljko Radeka
 Mark G. Raizen
 Arthur Penn Ramirez
 B. D. Nageswara Rao
 Glen Anderson Rebka
 Yuriko Renardy
 Dieter Richter
 Steven Lloyd Rolston
 William Frederick Saam
 Stanley Owen Schriber
 Jerold M. Schultz
 Silvan S. Schweber
 Gopal K. Shenoy
 Mikhail A. Shifman
 Boris Ionovich Shklovskii
 Dov Shvarts
 Steven J. Sibener
 Daniel M. Siegel
 David Joseph Singh
 James Lauriston Skinner
 Dennis Michael Skopik
 Andris Skuja
 Alexander J. Smits
 Charles G. Speziale
 Todor Stefanov Stanev
 Richard Mark Stratt
 Mark Strikman
 Richard L. Sutherland
 David Franklin Sutter
 Annick Suzor-Weiner
 Gregory William Swift
 Max Tabak
 Chao Tang
 Gregory Tarle
 Curtis Bruce Tarter
 John Edward Thomas
 Doug Toussaint
 John M. Tranquada
 Robert Tycko
 Arkady Vainshtein
 Chris G. Van de Walle
 Charles Peter Verdon
 Randall Harry Victora
 Giovanni Vignale
 Mikhail Boroso Voloshin
 Gregory Alan Voth
 Shiqing Wang
 Wen I. Wang
 Hendrick Josef Weerts
 Geoffrey B. West
 John Franklin Wilkerson
 Claudine Williams
 Hugh Harrison Williams
 Jack M. Wilson
 Alan James Wootton
 Bernard Yurke
 William A. Zajc
 Andrew Mark Zangwill
 Vladimir G. Zelevinsky
 Dean A. Zollman

See also
 List of American Physical Society Fellows (1921–1971)
 List of American Physical Society Fellows (1998–2010)
 List of American Physical Society Fellows (2011–)

References 

1972